Lisbon is an unincorporated community in Allen Township, Noble County, in the U.S. state of Indiana.

History
Lisbon was platted in 1847. According to Ronald L. Baker, the community probably was named after Lisbon, the capital of Portugal. A post office was established at Lisbon in 1849, and remained in operation until it was discontinued in 1919.

Geography

References

Unincorporated communities in Noble County, Indiana
Unincorporated communities in Indiana